Muyinga Province is one of the 18 provinces of Burundi.

Communes
It is divided administratively into the following communes:

 Commune of Buhinyuza
 Commune of Butihinda
 Commune of Gashoho
 Commune of Gasorwe
 Commune of Giteranyi
 Commune of Muyinga
 Commune of Mwakiro

 
Provinces of Burundi